Ondo State is one of the 36 States of Nigeria with Akure as the state capital.  This list of tertiary institutions in Ondo State includes universities, polytechnics and colleges.

List
Achievers University
Adekunle Ajasin University
Elizade University
Federal University of Technology, Akure
Ondo City Polytechnic, Ondo City 
Ondo State University of Science and Technology
Rufus Giwa Polytechnic
University of Medical Sciences, Ondo
Wesley University of Science and Technology
Federal College of Agriculture, Akure

References

Ondo